Serrasalmus neveriensis is a species of serrasalmid found in South America in the  Coastal rivers of Venezuela.

References

Serrasalmidae
Fish described in 1993